The women's discus throw event at the 2007 Asian Athletics Championships was held in Amman, Jordan on July 28.

Results

References
Final results

2007 Asian Athletics Championships
Discus throw at the Asian Athletics Championships
2007 in women's athletics